The communauté de communes des Deux Vallées was located in the Creuse département of the Limousin region of central France. It was created in January 1999. It was merged into the new Communauté de communes Portes de la Creuse en Marche in January 2014.

It comprised the following 5 communes:

Bonnat
Chambon-Sainte-Croix
Chéniers
Lourdoueix-Saint-Pierre
Malval

See also
Communes of the Creuse department

References  

Deux Vallees (Creuse)